Robin "Bob" Burns (August 2, 1890 – February 2, 1956) was an American musical comedian, who appeared on radio and in movies from 1930 to 1947. Burns played a novelty musical instrument of his own invention, which he called a "bazooka". During World War II, the US Army's handheld anti-tank rocket launcher was nicknamed the "bazooka".

Early years
He was born Robin Burn in Greenwood, Arkansas. When he was three years old, his family moved to Van Buren, Arkansas. As a boy, Burns played trombone and cornet in the town's "Queen City Silver Cornet Band". At 13, he formed his own string band.

Practicing in the back of Hayman's Plumbing Shop one night, he picked up a length of gas pipe and blew into it, creating an unusual sound. With modifications, this became a musical instrument he named a "bazooka" (after "bazoo", meaning a windy fellow, from the Dutch bazuin for "trumpet"). A photograph shows him playing his invention in the Silver Cornet Band. Functioning like a crude trombone, the musical bazooka had a narrow range, but this was intentional.

Burns also studied civil engineering and worked as a peanut farmer, but by 1911 was primarily an entertainer.

During World War I Burns enlisted in the United States Marine Corps. He sailed to France with the Marine 11th Regiment. As a sergeant, he became the leader of the Marine Corps's jazz band in Europe. Burns made another "bazooka" from stove pipes and a whiskey funnel, which he sometimes played with the Corps band. In September 1919, he and his "Marine Corps Melody Six" jazz band, with Burn playing his bazooka, were attached to the Marine Corps Recruiting Station in Manhattan.

The Arkansas Traveler
After the war, Burns returned to the stage, often playing the bazooka as part of his act. He used it as a prop when telling hillbilly stories and jokes. Burns became known as The Arkansas Traveler and The Arkansas Philosopher. His stage persona was a self-effacing, rustic bumpkin with amusing stories about "the kinfolks" back home in Van Buren. His character was patterned after Sandford C. Faulkner (1803–1874), composer of the popular fiddle tune, "The Arkansas Traveler".  A caricature of Burns on the cover of the book The Arkansas Traveler appears in the Looney Tunes cartoon "Book Revue" (1945).

Radio career
In 1930, Burns auditioned for a major Los Angeles radio station. He had prepared a 10-minute performance, but was asked to do 30 minutes, which he filled out with improvised stories and bazooka tunes. The managers did not care for his prepared material, but were impressed by his improvised material. Burns was hired. He appeared on an afternoon show, "The Fun Factory", as a character called "Soda Pop".

In 1935, on a visit to New York, Burns asked bandleader and radio star Paul Whiteman for an audition. Whiteman put Burns on his nightly show, the Kraft Music Hall, which was broadcast nationally; Burns was a big hit. Burns also became a regular on Rudy Vallee's show The Fleischmann's Yeast Hour.

Burns returned to Los Angeles in 1936, where Kraft Music Hall was now hosted by Bing Crosby. Burns was a regular, playing the bazooka and telling tall tales about his fictional hillbilly relatives, Uncle Fud and Aunt Doody.

Bob Burns was the host of The 10th Academy Awards held on March 10, 1938, at the Biltmore Hotel in Los Angeles, California.
Originally scheduled to be held on March 3, 1938, the ceremony was postponed due to heavy flooding in Los Angeles.

In 1941, Burns was given his own radio show, called The Arkansas Traveler (1941–43) and The Bob Burns Show (1943–47).

Newspaper column
From 1936 to 1940, Burns wrote a newspaper column, "Well, I'll Tell You," a column filler with brief homespun anecdotes. The daily feature was syndicated to 240 newspapers.

Film career
In 1930, Burns appeared briefly in the film Up the River playing the bazooka in blackface for a prison vaudeville show. Over the next five years, he appeared in 10 movies, either uncredited or in a minor role, usually playing the bazooka.

After his national radio breakthrough in 1935–1936, Burns moved up to feature roles as a contract player with Paramount Pictures. In Rhythm on the Range (1936) he was second lead with Crosby. He appeared in eleven more films in 1936 to 1940, including eight starring roles. Most of these were comedies, but he also played a crusading lawyer in the drama Our Leading Citizen (1939). He also appeared on the December 4, 1939 Lux Radio Theatre one-hour adaptation of A Man to Remember, taking Edward Ellis's film role as a humane small-town doctor battling the townspeople's greed.

In 1941, Burns broke with Paramount, rather than appear in a proposed film which he thought was excessively demeaning to "the people of his native hills".

In 1944, Burns appeared in the Technicolor musical Western film Belle of the Yukon (1944), set in the Canadian Gold Rush. Burns was top-billed with Randolph Scott, Gypsy Rose Lee and Dinah Shore. His last appearance was as co-star in The Windjammer (1945), which he helped write.

His last performance was on January 30, 1955, on The Ed Sullivan Show (then called Toast of the Town).

For his contributions to the film industry, Burns was inducted posthumously into the Hollywood Walk of Fame in 1960 with a motion pictures star located at 1601 Vine Street.

Personal life
In 1921, Burns married Elizabeth Anna Fisher. They had one child, Robert Jr., who was married to actress Naomi Stevens and who died in 2012. Elizabeth died in 1936. Burns then married his long-time secretary Harriet M. Foster in May 1939. They had three children, Barbara, William, and Stephen, and remained married until his death.

A wealthy man from his land investments, Burns spent his final years on his  model farm on Sherman Way in Canoga Park, in the San Fernando Valley of Los Angeles, California.

He died from kidney cancer in nearby Encino on February 2, 1956, at the age of 65.

Filmography

See also

Bob Burns House, his childhood home in Van Buren, Arkansas

References

External links

Bob Burns hometown tribute
Bob Burns tribute page
Audio files
 The Bob Burns Show (audition show of November 23, 1947), via Old Time Radio Show

American male comedians
American male film actors
American radio personalities
American male radio actors
1890 births
Military personnel from Arkansas
1956 deaths
Male actors from Arkansas
Male actors from California
United States Marine Corps non-commissioned officers
United States Marine Corps personnel of World War I
People from Canoga Park, Los Angeles
People from Greenwood, Arkansas
Vaudeville performers
Burials at Forest Lawn Memorial Park (Glendale)
Deaths from cancer in California
Deaths from kidney cancer
20th-century American male actors
Comedians from California
20th-century American comedians